Ebru Mandacı (born 7 March 1993) is a Turkish volleyball player. She competed at the 2015 CEV Volleyball Challenge Cup.

Clubs

References 

Living people
1993 births
Turkish women's volleyball players